Lady Blue may refer to:

 Lady Blue (anime), a 4-episode OVA in the anime series La Blue Girl
 Lady Blue, a fictional character in The Animals of Farthing Wood (TV series)
 Lady Blue (TV series), an American crime drama starring Jamie Rose
 "Lady Blue" (song), a song by Leon Russell on the album Will O' the Wisp
 "Lady Blue", a song by Enrique Bunbury on Flamingos (album)

See also 
 Blue Lady (disambiguation)